Bobryk is a village in Myrhorod Raion, Poltava Oblast, Ukraine. It has a population of 791. The local self-government body is the Bobrytska village council. The village of Bobryk is located on the left bank of the Psel River, downstream at a distance of 4.5 km is the village of Vepryk. The river in this place is winding, forming estuaries, and old and marshy lakes. It is located 22 kilometers from the district center and 24 kilometers to the Hadiach railway station. It has an elevation of 113 meters.  In 2022, it was invaded and captured by Russian forces for some time.

References 

Villages in Myrhorod Raion